Mingjian Township is a rural township in western Nantou County, Taiwan. It is the second smallest township in the county, after Jiji Township.

Name and etymology
The name Mingjian originates from a Japanese transliteration of the original Taiwanese Hokkien name, Làm-á, with literal meaning "a very wet place". This written form was retained after the Kuomintang takeover of Taiwan in 1945; the characters are pronounced Bêng-kan and Míngjiān in Taiwanese and Mandarin Chinese, respectively.

History
Mingjian was a hunting ground for the Taiwanese aborigines.

In 2008, the 100th congregation of the Church of Jesus Christ of Latter-day Saints in Taiwan was organized in Mingjian.

A leaning unused electrical pylon damaged in the 1999 Jiji earthquake, has been turned into an earthquake memorial.

Administrative divisions

Mingjian includes the villages of Buxia, Chishui, Dakeng, Dazhuang, Donghu, Kanjiao, Nanya, Puzhong, Renhe, Sanlun, Songbo, Songshan, Tanliao, Tianzi, Wandan, Xincuo Xinguang, Xinjie, Xinmin, Zhongshan, Zhongzheng, Zhuoshui, Zhuwei.

Transportation
 TRA Zhuoshui Station

Notable natives
 Chen Cheng-sheng, member of Legislative Yuan (1999-2002)

References

Townships in Nantou County